Charles Butts may refer to:

 Charles L. Butts (born 1942), member of the Ohio Senate (1975–1990)
 Charles Butts (paleontologist) (1863–1946), American paleontologist

See also
Charles W. Buttz (1837–1913),  U.S. Representative from South Carolina